The England national cricket team, under the auspices of Marylebone Cricket Club (MCC), toured Ceylon and Pakistan from January to March 1969 and played a three-match Test series against the Pakistani national cricket team. The Test series was drawn 0–0. England were captained by Colin Cowdrey and Pakistan by Saeed Ahmed. As Ceylon had not then achieved Test status, the international played at the Paikiasothy Saravanamuttu Stadium, Colombo, is classified as a first-class match. It ended in a draw.

Test series summary

First Test

Second Test

Third Test

References

External links

1969 in Ceylon
1969 in English cricket
1969 in Pakistani cricket
1969
1969
International cricket competitions from 1960–61 to 1970
Pakistani cricket seasons from 1947–48 to 1969–70
Sri Lankan cricket seasons from 1880–81 to 1971–72